Rail speed limits in the United States are regulated by the Federal Railroad Administration. Railroads also implement their own limits and enforce speed limits. Speed restrictions are based on a number of factors including curvature, signaling, track condition, and the presence of grade crossings. Like road speed limits in the United States, speed limits for tracks and trains are measured in miles per hour (mph).

Signal speeds

Federal regulators limit the speed of trains with respect to the signaling method used.  Passenger trains are limited to 59 mph and freight trains to 49 mph on track without block signal systems. (See dark territory.) Trains without "an automatic cab signal, automatic train stop or automatic train control system "may not exceed 79 mph."  The order was issued in 1947 (effective 31 Dec 1951) by the Interstate Commerce Commission following a severe 1946 crash in Naperville, Illinois involving two Chicago, Burlington & Quincy Railroad trains.  Following the 1987 Maryland train collision, freight trains operating in enhanced-speed corridors have been required to have locomotive speed limiters to forcibly slow trains rather than simply alerting the operator with in-cab signals.  The signal panel in the Maryland crash had been partially disabled, with a muted whistle and a missing light bulb.

Following the 2008 Chatsworth train collision in California, a federal law was enacted requiring positive train control (PTC) to be implemented nationwide by 2015. After multiple deadline extensions, on December 29, 2020 PTC technology was announced by the FRA to be in operation on all required freight and passenger railroad route miles.  While a primary goal of PTC is to prevent collisions, it also fulfills the FRA requirements for increased speeds in some cases.  Several competing PTC technologies are used in different regions of the country.

Track classes

In the United States, the Federal Railroad Administration has developed a system of classification for track quality. The class of a section of track determines the maximum possible running speed limits and the ability to run passenger trains.

Curves

Assuming a suitably maintained track, maximum track speed through curves is limited by the "centrifugal force" which acts to overturn the train. To compensate for this force, the track is superelevated (the outer rail is raised higher than the inner rail). The speed at which the centrifugal force is perfectly offset by the tilt of the track is known as the balancing speed.  Maximum speed can be found using the following formula, which provides an allowance for trains to operate above the balancing speed:

where:
 is the amount in inches that the outside rail is superelevated above the inside rail on a curve 
 is the amount in inches of unbalanced superelevation
 is the degree of curvature in degrees per 
 is given in miles per hour

Normally, passenger trains run above the balancing speed, and the difference between the balancing superelevation for the speed and curvature and the actual superelevation on the curve is known as unbalanced superelevation. Tilting trains like the Acela operate with even higher unbalanced superelevation, by dynamically shifting the weight of the train. The actual overturning speed of a train is much higher than the limits set by the speed formula, which is largely in place for passenger comfort.

The allowed unbalanced superelevation will cause trains to run with normal flange contact.  The points of wheel-rail contact are influenced by the tire profile of the wheels. Allowance has to be made for the different speeds of trains. Slower trains will tend to make flange contact with the inner rail on curves, while faster trains will tend to ride outwards and make contact with the outer rail. Either contact causes wear and tear and may lead to derailment if speeds and superelevation are not within the permitted limits. Many high-speed lines do not permit the use of slower freight trains, particularly with heavier axle loads. In some cases, the wear or friction of flange contact on curves is reduced by the use of flange lubrication.

See also

 Slow zone
 Rail regulations in Canada
 Railroad operations
 Railway signalling

References

Rail transport operations
Rail infrastructure in the United States
United States railroad regulation